The following lists events that happened during 1989 in New Zealand.

Population
 Estimated population as of 31 December: 3,369,800
 Increase since 31 December 1988: 24,600 (0.74%)
 Males per 100 Females: 97.1

Incumbents

Regal and viceregal
 Head of State – Elizabeth II
 Governor-General – The Rt Revd. Sir Paul Reeves GCMG GCVO QSO

Government
The 42nd New Zealand Parliament continued. The fourth Labour Party government was in power.
 Speaker of the House – Kerry Burke
 Prime Minister – David Lange then Geoffrey Palmer
 Deputy Prime Minister – Geoffrey Palmer then Helen Clark
 Minister of Finance – David Caygill
 Minister of Foreign Affairs – Russell Marshall
 Chief Justice – Sir Ronald Davison (until 4 February), Sir Thomas Eichelbaum (starting 4 February)

Parliamentary opposition 
 Leader of the Opposition – Jim Bolger (National).

Main centre leaders
 Mayor of Auckland – Catherine Tizard
 Mayor of Hamilton – Ross Jansen then Margaret Evans
 Mayor of Wellington – Jim Belich
 Mayor of Christchurch – Hamish Hay then Vicki Buck
 Mayor of Dunedin – Cliff Skeggs then Richard Walls

Events 
 First annual balance of payments surplus since 1973.
 The Reserve Bank Act sets the role of the Reserve Bank of New Zealand as maintaining price stability.
 The Tomorrow's Schools reforms shift substantial financial and administrative responsibilities for managing schools to elected boards of trustees.
 Local Government elections under a revised structure.
 The Māori Fisheries Act passed.
 The Sale of Liquor Act passed; it provided for supermarkets to sell wine (but not beer; this happened in 1999). Two amendments were also passed in 1989.
 April: Swedish tourists Urban Höglin and Heidi Paakkonen disappear while backpacking in the Coromandel, leading to the largest land-based search undertaken in New Zealand.
 25 April: David Lange suggests New Zealand should withdraw from the ANZUS council.
 29 April: The Taranaki Herald publishes its last issue. The newspaper had published since 1852, and was New Zealand's oldest newspaper from 1935.
 1 May: Jim Anderton forms the NewLabour Party.
 7 August: David Lange resigns as Prime Minister of New Zealand and is replaced by Geoffrey Palmer.
 26 November: TV3 begins broadcasting.
 28 November: The Abolition of the Death Penalty Act received Royal assent.
 10 December: Sunday trading begins.

Arts and literature
 Renee wins the Robert Burns Fellowship.

See 1989 in art, 1989 in literature, :Category:1989 books

Music

New Zealand Music Awards 

Winners are shown first with nominees underneath.
 Album of the Year: Margaret Urlich–Safety in Numbers
Fan Club – Respect The Beat
The Front Lawn – Songs from The Front Lawn
 Single of the Year: Margaret Urlich – "Escaping"
Fan Club – I Feel Love
Double J and Twice the T/ Ray Columbus – She's A Mod
 Best Male Vocalist: Tim Finn
Howard Morrison
Barry Saunders
 Best Female Vocalist: Margaret Urlich
Moana Jackson
Aishah
 Best Group: When The Cat's Away
The Warratahs
The Fan Club
 Most Promising Male Vocalist: Paul Ubana Jones
Greg Johnson
Darren Watson
 Most Promising Female Vocalist: Janet Roddick
Belinda Bradley
Julie Collier
 Most Promising Group: The Front Lawn
Double J and Twice the T
Upper Hutt Posse
 International Achievement: The Front Lawn
Kiri Te Kanawa
Straitjacket Fits
 Outstanding Contribution to the Music Industry: Tony Vercoe
 Best Video: Paul Middleditch / Polly Walker / Debbie Watson – I Feel Love (Fan Club)
Warrick (Waka) Attewell – St Peter's Rendezvous (Barry Saunders)
Tony Johns – She's A Mod/ Mod RAP (Double J and Twice the T)
 Best Film Soundtrack / Compilation: The Front Lawn – Songs From The Front Lawn
Rahda and the Brats -Kid in the Middle
Various – This Is The Moment
 Best Producer: Ian Morris – Nobody Else
Mike Chunn – All Wrapped Up
Ross McDermott/Annie Crummer – Melting Pot (When The Cat's Away)
 Best Engineer: Nigel Stone/ Tim Farrant – Everything Will Be Alright
DC Bell – Please Say Something
Nick Morgan – Melting Pot
 Best Jazz Album: No Award
 Best Classical Album: Stanley Friedman – The Lyric Trumpet
Various Artists – Bold is Brass
Michael Houston – Scriabin/ Chopin
 Best Folk Album: Paul Ubana Jones – Paul Ubana Jones
Phil Powers – The Light of the Lions Eye
Phil Garland – Wind in the Tussock
 Best Gospel Album: Stephen Bell-Booth–Shelter
Guy Wishart – Another Day in Paradise
Steve Apirana – Steve Apirana
 Best Polynesian Album: Howard Morrison – Tukua Ahau
Moana & The Moa Hunters – Pupurutia
Black Katz Trust – Ko Wai Ka Hua
 Best Songwriter: Barry Saunders – St Peters Rendezvous
Tim Finn – Parihaka
Don McGlashan / Harry Sinclair – Andy
 Best Cover: Polly Walker / Debbie Watson – Safety in Numbers (Margaret Urlich)
Gavin Blake – Workshop
Anthony Donaldson/ Cadre Communications- The Hills Are Alive

See: 1989 in music

Performing arts

 Benny Award presented by the Variety Artists Club of New Zealand to Sylvia Rielly.

Radio and television
 3 April: Paul Holmes makes his first broadcast.
 1 July: The Broadcasting Act 1989 removes restriction of broadcasting. The public broadcasting fee of NZ$110 per annum is established.
 1 July: The Dunedin station is reduced to the Natural History Unit.
 6 November: Channel 2 introduces morning television by commencing transmission at 6.30am weekdays and 7am weekends.
 26 November: TV3 begins broadcasting with a two-hour preview show, with regular programming to follow at 7am the next morning.

See: 1989 in New Zealand television, 1989 in television, List of TVNZ television programming, :Category:Television in New Zealand, TV3 (New Zealand), :Category:New Zealand television shows, Public broadcasting in New Zealand

Film
See: :Category:1989 film awards, 1989 in film, List of New Zealand feature films, Cinema of New Zealand, :Category:1989 films

Sport

Athletics
 Paul Ballinger wins his fourth national title in the men's marathon, clocking 2:18:21 on 29 April in Rotorua, while Bernardine Portenski claims her first in the women's championship (2:46:02).

Horse racing

Harness racing
 New Zealand Trotting Cup: Inky Lord
 Auckland Trotting Cup: Neroship

Shooting
Ballinger Belt – Ken Meade (Petone)

Soccer
 The Chatham Cup is won by Christchurch United who beat Rotorua City 7–1 in the final.

Births

January
 1 January – Willie Isa, rugby league player
 3 January – Ben Matulino, rugby league player
 6 January – Peter Betham, rugby union player
 8 January – Aaron Cruden, rugby union player
 18 January – Bryce Heem, rugby union player
 20 January – Jared Waerea-Hargreaves, rugby league player
 21 January
 Brayden Mitchell, rugby union player
 Dominique Peyroux, rugby league player
 Nafi Tuitavake, rugby union player
 23 January – Patrick Peng, gymnast
 26 January
 Nicole Lewis, water polo player
 Shaun Treeby, rugby union player
 28 January – Emma Crum, road cyclist
 29 January – Bradley Rodden, cricketer

February
 1 February – Robert Eastham, sport shooter
 2 February
 Shane Archbold, racing cyclist
 Codey Rei, rugby union player
 6 February – Greg Morgan, cricketer
 7 February – Hayley Saunders, netball player
 8 February – Zac Guildford, rugby union player
 9 February – Frae Wilson, rugby union player
 12 February – Ellen Barry, tennis player
 13 February – Daniel Faleafa, rugby union player
 14 February – Sam Johnson, community activist
 16 February
 Phillipa Gray, Paralympic track cyclist
 Ria van Dyke, beauty pageant contestant
 19 February – Olivia Jobsis, artistic gymnast
 21 February – Gareth Dawson, basketball player
 24 February – Germaine Tang, rhythmic gymnast
 28 February – Kevin Proctor, rugby league player

March
 2 March – James So'oialo, rugby union player
 10 March – Reta Trotman, road cyclist
 11 March
 Annabelle Carey, swimmer
 Tom Taylor, rugby union player
 14 March – Katie Glynn, field hockey player
 16 March – Patrick Leafa, rugby union player
 17 March – Richard Kingi, rugby union player
 20 March
 Karl Bryson, rugby union player
 Andrew Pohl, cross-country skier
 24 March – Leighton Price, rugby union player
 27 March – Camilla Lees, netball player
 28 March – Rachel Mercer, road cyclist
 30 March – Adam McGeorge, association footballer

April
 3 April – Te Huinga Reo Selby-Rickit, netball player
 4 April – Kevin Locke, rugby league player
 6 April – Joe Matapuku, rugby league player
 7 April – Michael Guptill-Bunce, cricketer
 15 April – Arana Taumata, rugby league player
 17 April – Fa'atiga Lemalu, rugby union player
 19 April – Lauren Ellis, track cyclist
 22 April – Arun Panchia, field hockey player
 26 April – Lucy Talbot, field hockey player
 27 April – Hamish Rutherford, cricketer
 30 April – Milo Cawthorne, actor

May
 3 May – Jesse Bromwich, rugby league player
 6 May – Rocky Khan, rugby union player
 8 May
 Tinirau Arona, rugby league player
 Hayley Palmer, swimmer
 9 May – Shane van Gisbergen, motor racing driver
 10 May – Sean Reidy, rugby union player
 11 May – Te Amo Amaru-Tibble, basketball and netball player
 14 May – Vanessa Vandy, pole vaulter
 15 May – Bailey Junior Kurariki, convicted criminal
 17 May – Mose Masoe, rugby league player
 21 May – Emily Robins, actor
 27 May
 Richard Buckman, rugby union player
 Bailey Mes, netball player
 31 May – Chase Stanley, rugby league player

June
 2 June – Willy Moon, musician
 7 June – James Hamilton, snowboarder
 9 June – Baden Kerr, rugby union player
 10 June – William Whetton, rugby union player
 12 June – Tim Nanai-Williams, rugby union player
 15 June – Katie Pearce, rhythmic gymnast
 21 June – Albert Anae, rugby union player
 23 June – Lisa Carrington, flatwater canoer

July
 5 July – Lizzie Marvelly, singer, songwriter
 9 July
 Ella Gunson, field hockey player
 Claire Kersten, netball player
 13 July – Joel Abraham, cricketer
 19 July – Sam McKendry, rugby league player
 21 July
 Jordan Selwyn, actor
 Maama Vaipulu, rugby union player
 22 July – Trent Boult, cricketer
 25 July – Blair Tuke, sailor
 27 July
 Penelope Marshall, swimmer
 Jason Schirnack, rugby league player
 31 July – Charlotte Harrison, field hockey player

August
 3 August – Teddy Stanaway, rugby union player
 11 August – Eddie Dawkins, track cyclist
 13 August – Greg Draper, association footballer
 15 August
 Kendall Brown, snowboarder
 Jordan Rapana, rugby league player
 16 August – Alistair Bond, rower
 21 August – Natasha Hind, swimmer
 22 August – Robbie Robinson, rugby union player
 23 August – George Worker, cricketer
 31 August – James Lassche, rower

September
 1 September – Sophie Devine, cricketer and field hockey player
 4 September – Elliot Dixon, rugby union player
 8 September – Jessica McCormack, basketball and netball player
 11 September – Brendon O'Connor, rugby union player
 13 September – Kenny Edwards, rugby league player
 14 September
 Constantine Mika, rugby league player
 Pana Hema Taylor, actor
 15 September
 David Ambler, sprint athlete
 Chetan Ramlu, musician
 16 September – Nick Beard, cricketer
 19 September
 Marty Banks, rugby union player
 Belgium Tuatagaloa, rugby union player
 20 September – Evan Williams, squash player
 21 September – Sandor Earl, rugby league player
 23 September – Michael Arms, rower
 24 September
 Cathryn Finlayson, field hockey player
 Leilani Van Dieren, rhythmic gymnast

October
 7 October – Ben Botica, rugby union player
 8 October – Sione Lousi, rugby league player
 9 October – Russell Packer, rugby league player
 10 October – Andrew Mathieson, cricketer
 11 October – Robbie Manson, rower
 12 October – Sarah Miller, artistic gymnast
 13 October – Izaac Williams, basketball player
 15 October – Dominic Storey, motor racing driver
 19 October – Junior Fa, boxer
 21 October – Ivana Palezevic, actor
 23 October – Lauren Sieprath, water polo player
 25 October – Tim Bond, rugby union player
 28 October
 Kelly Brazier, rugby union player
 Claire Broadbent, rhythmic gymnast
 Sam Dickson, rugby union player

November
 1 November – Alehana Mara, rugby league player
 2 November – Michael Pollard, cricketer
 3 November – The Phantom Chance, Thoroughbred racehorse
 8 November – Jessica Moulds, netball player
 9 November – Marcus Daniell, tennis player
 10 November – Brendon Hartley, motor racing driver
 12 November – Dean Robinson, cricketer
 13 November – Alex Feneridis, association footballer
 14 November
 Jake Robertson, athlete
 Zane Robertson, athlete
 15 November – Natasha Hansen, track cyclist
 15 November – Courtney Abbot, actor
 18 November – Brady Barnett, cricketer
 19 November – Andrew Marck, baseball player
 20 November – Abby Erceg, association footballer
 29 November – Jonathon Bassett-Graham, cricketer

December
 2 December – Jack Wilson, rugby union player
 4 December – Buxton Popoali'i, rugby union player
 7 December – Ria Percival, association footballer
 8 December
 Jono Lester, motor racing driver
 Jesse Sene-Lefao, rugby league player
 14 December – Amini Fonua, swimmer
 15 December
 David Ambler, track athlete
 Ian Hogg, association footballer
 20 December – Leeson Ah Mau, rugby league player
 21 December – Ashley Smallfield, water polo player
 22 December – Josh Junior, sailor
 29 December – Michael Stanley, rugby union player

Exact date unknown
 Ben Sanders, crime writer
 Owen Walker, computer hacker

Deaths

January–March
 8 January – Giovanni Cataldo, fisherman, search & rescue organiser (born 1927)
 21 January – Tiny Leys, rugby union player (born 1907)
 22 January – Fred Ladd, aviator (born 1908)
 29 January – Seton Otway, racehorse owner and breeder (born 1894)
 2 February
 Harry Highet, engineer, designer of the P-class yacht (born 1892)
 Sir Arnold Nordmeyer, politician (born 1901)
 9 February – Bill Dalley, rugby union player and administrator (born 1901)
 13 February – Archie Strang. rugby union player (born 1906)
 15 February – Hōri Ngata, lexicographer, local-body politician (born 1919)
 20 February – Stuart Black, athlete (born 1908)
 24 February – Leila Hurle, educator, school inspector (born 1901)
 4 March
 Harold Miller, librarian, historian (born 1898)
 Randolph Rose, athlete (born 1901)
 7 March – Nevile Lodge, cartoonist (born 1918)
 8 March – Alf Budd, rugby union player (born 1922)

April–June
 2 April – Sir James Henare, soldier, Ngāpuhi leader (born 1911)
 6 April – Marjorie Chambers, nurse, nursing tutor and administrator (born 1906)
 13 April – Frank Hofmann, photographer, musician (born 1916)
 22 April
 Mary Campbell, librarian, Quaker (born 1907)
 Vi Farrell, cricketer (born 1913)
 23 April – Rupert Worker, cricketer (born 1896)
 30 April – Nelson Dalzell, rugby union player (born 1921)
 2 May – Freddie French, rugby league player (born 1911)
 5 May – Dame Sister Mary Leo, music teacher (born 1895)
 13 May – Sir Lance Cross, basketball player, sports administrator and broadcaster (born 1912)
 4 June – Vernon Cracknell, politician (born 1912)
 12 June – Cath Vautier, netball player, coach and administrator (born 1902)
 26 June – Earle Riddiford, lawyer and mountaineer (born 1921)

July–September
 1 July
 Eric Holland, politician (born 1921)
 Olga Sansom, botanist, broadcaster, museum director (born 1900)
 15 July – Jack Scholes, sailor (born 1917)
 14 August – Sir Dove-Myer Robinson, politician, mayor of Auckland (1968–80) (born 1901)
 28 August – Sir Robert Macintosh, anaesthetist (born 1897)
 1 September – Mac Cooper, agricultural scientist (born 1910)
 4 September – Sir Ronald Syme, historian (born 1903)
 11 September
 Roy Traill, wildlife ranger (born 1892)
 Freddie Wood, historian (born 1903)
 14 September – Eddie McLeod, cricketer (born 1900)
 15 September – Harry Cave, cricketer (born 1922)
 18 September – Sir Peter Phipps, military leader (born 1908)

October–December
 1 October – David Penman, Anglican archbishop (born 1936)
 2 October – Bert Grenside, rugby union player (born 1899)
 7 October
 Keith Elliott, soldier, recipient of the Victoria Cross (born 1916)
 Pat Twohill, actor and radio announcer (born 1915)
 11 October – Joe Procter, rugby union player (born 1906)
 14 October – Rodney Kennedy, artist, art critic, pacifist (born 1909)
 23 October – Howard Alloo, cricketer (born 1895)
 24 October – Eileen Soper, journalist, writer, Girl Guide commissioner (born 1900)
 26 October – Andrew Roberts, cricketer (born 1947)
 18 November – Pat Hond, police officer, teacher, Taranaki Māori leader (born 1927)
 25 November – Kōhine Pōnika, composer of waiata Māori (born 1920)
 28 November
 Beethoven Algar, rugby union player (born 1894)
 Stan Cawtheray, association footballer (born 1906)
 30 November – Wiremu Heke, rugby union player (born 1894)
 2 December – Norman Davis, English language and literature academic (born 1913)
 8 December – Jack Rankin, rugby union player and coach (born 1914)
 9 December – Brett Austin, swimmer (born 1959)
 13 December – Peter de la Mare, physical organic chemist (born 1920)
 27 December – Ron Ulmer, track cyclist (born 1913)

See also
 List of years in New Zealand
 Timeline of New Zealand history
 History of New Zealand
 Military history of New Zealand
 Timeline of the New Zealand environment
 Timeline of New Zealand's links with Antarctica

References

External links

NZ Internet History

 
New Zealand
Years of the 20th century in New Zealand